In statics, the block-stacking problem (sometimes known as The Leaning Tower of Lire , also the book-stacking problem, or a number of other similar terms) is a puzzle concerning the stacking of blocks at the edge of a table.

Statement

The block-stacking problem is the following puzzle:

Place  identical rigid rectangular blocks in a stable stack on a table edge in such a way as to maximize the overhang.

 provide a long list of references on this problem going back to mechanics texts from the middle of the 19th century.

Variants

Single-wide
The single-wide problem involves having only one block at any given level.  In the ideal case of perfectly rectangular blocks, the solution to the single-wide problem is that the maximum overhang is given by  times the width of a block. This sum is one half of the corresponding partial sum of the harmonic series. Because the harmonic series diverges, the maximal overhang tends to infinity as  increases, meaning that it is possible to achieve any arbitrarily large overhang, with sufficient blocks.

The number of blocks required to reach at least  block-lengths past the edge of the table is 4, 31, 227, 1674, 12367, 91380, ... .

Multi-wide

Multi-wide stacks using counterbalancing can give larger overhangs than a single width stack. Even for three blocks, stacking two counterbalanced blocks on top of another block can give an overhang of 1, while the overhang in the simple ideal case is at most . As  showed, asymptotically, the maximum overhang that can be achieved by multi-wide stacks is proportional to the cube root of the number of blocks, in contrast to the single-wide case in which the overhang is proportional to the logarithm of the number of blocks. However, it has been shown that in reality this is impossible and the number of blocks that we can move to the right, due to block stress, is not more than a specified number. For example, for a special brick with  = , Young's modulus  =  and density  =  and limiting compressive stress ,the approximate value of  will be 853 and the maximum tower height becomes .

Robustness
 discusses this problem, shows that it is robust to nonidealizations such as rounded block corners and finite precision of block placing, and introduces several variants including nonzero friction forces between adjacent blocks.

References in media 
In 2018, Michael Stevens, creator of various YouTube channels including Vsauce and D!NG, uploaded a video where Michael and former MythBusters star Adam Savage, discuss and construct a model of the block-stacking problem using plywood.

References

.

External links 
 
 

Statics
Mathematical problems